The Agriculture and Consumer Protection Act of 1973 (P.L. 93-86, also known as the 1973 U.S. Farm Bill) was the 4-year farm bill that adopted target prices and deficiency payments as a tool that would support farm income but reduce forfeitures to the Commodity Credit Corporation (CCC) of surplus stocks. (Target prices were eliminated by the 1996 farm bill (P.L. 104-127), but restored by the 2002 farm bill (P.L. 101-171, Sec. 1104).) It reduced payment limitations to $20,000 (from $55,000 set in 1970) for all program crops. The Act might be considered the first omnibus farm bill because it went beyond simply authorizing farm commodity programs. It authorized disaster payments and disaster reserve inventories; created the Rural Environmental Conservation Program; amended the Food Stamp Act of 1964 (P.L. 88-525), authorized the use of commodities for feeding low income mothers and young children (the origin of the Commodity Supplemental Food Program; and amended the Consolidated Farm and Rural Development Act of 1972 (P.L. 92-419).

References 

United States federal agriculture legislation
Consumer protection legislation